Signs Wonder Chibambo (born 13 October 1987 in Kitwe) is a Zambian football forward.

Career
Chibambo began his career with  Nakambala Leopards F.C. and played for the club before being loaned in January 2008 to ZESCO United. After a half-year with ZESCO United, he returned to Nakambala Leopards, but was sold in April 2009 to Heartland F.C. In December 2010 left Nigerian side Heartland F.C. and signed with Egyptian Premier League club El-Masry.

International career
He played for the under-23 team.

References

1987 births
Living people
People from Kitwe
Zambian footballers
Nakambala Leopards F.C. players 
ZESCO United F.C. players
Heartland F.C. players
Binh Dinh FC players
Hapoel Ra'anana A.F.C. players
NAPSA Stars F.C. players
Zambia international footballers
Association football forwards
Liga Leumit players
Zambian expatriate footballers
Expatriate footballers in Nigeria
Zambian expatriate sportspeople in Nigeria
Expatriate footballers in Vietnam
Zambian expatriate sportspeople in Vietnam
Expatriate footballers in Israel
Zambian expatriate sportspeople in Israel